Maryville University of St. Louis is a private university in Town and Country, Missouri. It was originally founded on April 6, 1872 by the Society of the Sacred Heart and offers more than 90 degrees at the undergraduate, graduate, and doctoral levels to students from 50 states and 47 countries. The school's name is derived from the shortening and altering of "Mary's Villa" when the school opened as an all women-school in the country outside of the order's original downtown St. Louis location in 1872 (an area that today is within the boundaries of the city of St. Louis). In 1961 it moved to suburban St. Louis and in 1968 began admitting men. Since 1972 the university has been governed by a board of trustees consisting mostly of members of the laity, although five of the trustees are always associated with the Society of the Sacred Heart. The school's athletic nickname is now the Saints.

History
Maryville was founded in 1872 by the Society of the Sacred Heart and was originally called Maryville Academy of the Sacred Heart and served underprivileged youth and young women.

It was located in the Mount Pleasant neighborhood in South St. Louis on a 21-acre tract at 2900 Meramec Avenue.  The main administration building was a five-story building with a cupola in the middle.

The school became a junior college in 1921, then a four-year college in 1923 and was renamed Maryville College of the Sacred Heart.

In the late 1950s, the school purchased  of land adjacent to Interstate 64, which was then St. Louis' main east–west thoroughfare. The dedication of the new campus on this site in 1961 marked the beginning of Maryville's move toward being a community-oriented liberal arts institution. In 1968, the University became a co-educational institution. In Maryville's Centennial year of 1972, ownership of the college was transferred to a lay board of trustees. In 1981, Maryville launched Weekend College, making it possible for the first time for St. Louis-area working adults to complete entire degree programs entirely on weekends. In June 1991, Maryville made the transition to university status.

The old campus became Augustinian Academy for Boys.  It closed in 1972.  Duchesne Hall burned in 1973 and was demolished, making way for the Maryville Gardens branch of the post office. The dormitories and other buildings were converted into the Maryville Gardens apartment complex.

Since the opening of the West County Main Campus, additional construction has accompanied the institution's growth. The University Library opened in 1988. Former President Keith Lovin initiated a significant amount of construction in 1997 with the construction of the new Art & Design Building and the link between academic buildings. The Donius University Center was completed in 2001, the new theatre auditorium opened in 2002, and apartment style dormitories in 2003. An additional apartment building and the Buder Family Commons were completed in 2006. In the Fall of 2010, Potter Hall (residence hall) – which had been purchased from the Marriott Corporation – was opened for students, and construction began on the dining court in Gander Hall. On September 27, 2013, Maryville broke ground for Myrtle E. and Earl E. Walker Hall. Walker Hall opened in January 2015 and houses the Myrtle E. and Earl E. Walker College of Health Professions and the Catherine McAuley School of Nursing. A new residence hall is currently under construction, with an expected opening date of Fall 2016.

In addition to the main campus, Maryville University also operated centers in Lake Saint Louis and Sunset Hills in Missouri and Scott Air Force Base in Illinois. These centers offered facilities and services for students enrolled in the University's Weekend and Evening College. These centers are now closed.

Academics

Academic units
There are six colleges and schools at Maryville University.
The College of Arts and Sciences offers graduate and undergraduate programs within the five main areas of art and design, the humanities, science and mathematics, and the social sciences.
The School of Education has a broad range of undergraduate and graduate programs in education. In Fall 2011, Maryville added a Doctor of Education program with a focus on Higher Education Leadership. Maryville uses a unique approach to this program. It delivers the class in a cohort of 15-22 students who advance through classes together (separate from the other concentration students), forming a supportive academic and professional network.
The Catherine McAuley School of Nursing is named in recognition of a gift from Mercy and is the namesake of the founder of the Sisters of Mercy. The school continues a longstanding tradition at Maryville of ensuring a strong education in healthcare. There have been nearly 3,000 nursing graduates who completed their clinicals locally and their degrees online.
The Walker College of Health Professions provides a wide range of programs in the health professions, including physical therapy, occupational therapy, music therapy, rehabilitation counseling, speech language pathology, healthcare practice management and communication science and disorders. Maryville is one of only three universities in Missouri to offer a degree in music therapy.
The John E. Simon School of Business, named after the late St. Louis philanthropist, offers programs in accounting, marketing, e-business, business administration, information systems, cybersecurity, financial services, internet marketing, international business, sport business management, and other areas of business studies. In 2014, Maryville University launched an accelerated online MBA program for distance learners. The school fosters a strong relationship with Edward Jones Investments. The John E. Simon School of Business also houses the Maryville Virtual Lab for online learning in the cybersecurity field.
The School of Adult and Online Education provides educational opportunities online and through the Weekend and Evening College on the main campus.

Ranking
Maryville University's ranking in the 2020 U.S. News & World Report edition of Best Colleges is tied at 202 in National Universities.

Accreditation
In 1925, Maryville, Fontbonne, and Webster Colleges were accorded the status of "corporate colleges" of Saint Louis University and were accredited by the North Central Association of Colleges and Secondary Schools. Maryville has been independently accredited since 1941.

Maryville University of Saint Louis is accredited by the Higher Learning Commission and is a member of the North Central Association of Colleges and Schools. The nursing program is accredited by the Commission on Collegiate Nursing Education and the Missouri State Board of Nursing. The Simon School of Business is accredited by the Accreditation Council for Business Schools and Programs (ACBSP). Teacher education is accredited by the National Council for Accreditation of Teacher Education (NCATE) and the Missouri Department of Elementary and Secondary Education. Relevant programs within the College of Arts and Sciences are accredited by the American Bar Association Standing Committee on Paralegals, the Council for Interior Design Accreditation (CIDA)  (formerly known as FIDER), the National Association of Schools of Art and Design, and the National Association of Schools of Music.

Maryville University Library 
The Maryville University Library building opened in 1988 and was renovated in 2007 and again in 2015. Its 54,000 square foot area, on two floors, contain over a quarter of a million volumes plus collections of reference works, periodicals, and databases. As a member of the Missouri Bibliographic Information User System (MOBIUS), the library offers students interlibrary loan (ILL) from any other member institution. Other resources include eBooks, streaming video, the New York Times, and access to UpToDate.

Athletics 

Maryville athletic teams are known as the Saints. The university competes at the NCAA Division II level in the Great Lakes Valley Conference (GLVC). Maryville was accepted into the GLVC for the 2009–10 school year, when the school began the transition to NCAA Division II athletics. Maryville became an active member of Division II in July 2011. The Saints had formerly competed in the St. Louis Intercollegiate Athletic Conference, a Division III conference, since 1989 and had competed in Division III sports since 1978.

Maryville University sponsors teams in 11 men's and 12 women's NCAA sanctioned sports.

Student life

Residential halls 
Maryville University has four residential spaces: Mouton Hall, Potter Hall, Saints Hall, and Hilltop Apartments.

Notable alumni
 Florence Magruder Gilmore (1881-1945), author and settlement worker

References

External links 

Maryville Athletics website

 
Private universities and colleges in Missouri
Universities and colleges in St. Louis County, Missouri
Educational institutions established in 1872
1872 establishments in Missouri
Catholic universities and colleges in Missouri
Roman Catholic Archdiocese of St. Louis
Buildings and structures in St. Louis County, Missouri